Saint-Didier-en-Bresse (literally Saint-Didier in Bresse) is a commune in the Saône-et-Loire department in the region of Bourgogne-Franche-Comté in eastern France.

See also
Communes of the Saône-et-Loire department

References

Communes of Saône-et-Loire